Laerru is a comune (municipality) in the Province of Sassari in the Italian region Sardinia, located about  north of Cagliari and about  northeast of Sassari.

Laerru borders the following municipalities: Bulzi, Martis, Nulvi, Perfugas, Sedini.

References

Cities and towns in Sardinia